Yoro Diakité (17 October 1932 – 13 June 1973) was a Malian politician and military figure. Diakite was the Prime Minister of Mali and Head of the Provisional Government from 19 November 1968 to 18 September 1969, and then Vice President of the ruling junta. After being accused of organizing a coup attempt in 1971, he was condemned to life imprisonment and died in the Taoudenni prison camp in June 1973.

References 
 "Dependency and Conservative Militarism in Mali" The Journal of Modern African Studies, 1975

1932 births
1972 deaths
Malian military personnel
Prime Ministers of Mali
Vice presidents of Mali
Malian prisoners sentenced to life imprisonment
Prisoners sentenced to life imprisonment by Mali
Malian people who died in prison custody
Prisoners who died in Malian detention